Psycho-Pass is a Japanese anime television series produced by Production I.G, directed by Naoyoshi Shiotani and Katsuyuki Motohiro, and written by Gen Urobuchi. It is set in the near future, when it is possible to instantaneously measure a person's "Psycho-Pass": their mental state, personality, and the probability that they will commit a crime. The series follows Akane Tsunemori, a new member of Unit One of the Public Safety Bureau's Criminal Investigation Division, and her involvement in the crimes her group investigates.

It premiered on October 12, 2012, in Fuji TV's Noitamina block, and ended on March 22, 2013, with a total of twenty-two episodes. Toho began releasing the series on DVD and Blu-ray on December 21, 2012, and ended with the eighth volume on July 26, 2013. Each volume included extras such as CD soundtracks and a visual novel. A "new edit" version of the series, dividing the season into 11 episodes with new footage, premiered in Japan in 2014. The fourth episode of the original run was cancelled for unknown reasons, with Shiotani apologizing to the fans.

Funimation has licensed the series in North America and simulcast the series on their website. A home-video version was released on March 11, 2014. In the United Kingdom it is licensed by Manga Entertainment, and in Australia by Madman Entertainment. The series is also available on the streaming service Crunchyroll in English-speaking regions.

It has two opening and closing themes. Its opening theme from episode 12 onward is "Out of Control" by Nothing's Carved in Stone, and the closing theme is "All Alone With You" by Egoist.


Episode list

Home media

Japanese release

North American release

Australian release

United Kingdom release

References

2012 Japanese television seasons
Psycho-Pass